Trinity College of Vermont was a Catholic college located in Burlington, Vermont between  and .

Trinity was founded by the Sisters of Mercy of Vermont in September 1925 as New England's second Catholic women's college. The college was opened to provide an education to women, who at the time were an underserved population in the state of Vermont. The earliest students were taught in the areas of English, French, religion, mathematics, business skills, and the classics. Trinity College of Vermont was a pioneer in education and community service and promoted a mission of social justice.

It was closed in 2000 due to financial constraints, after which the University of Vermont purchased its campus. By the time of its closing, 5,000 students had been educated at Trinity.

After the college's closing, Trinity's graduate-level programs moved to the Vermont Center at Southern New Hampshire University in Colchester, where they continued to be directed by former Trinity administrators. Business classes were moved to the newly formed Mercy Connections in Burlington, where the Women's Small Business Program continues to offer entrepreneurial classes and support to women today.

See also 
 List of colleges and universities in Vermont
 List of current and historical women's universities and colleges

References

External links 
 Trinity College of Vermont closure press release
 A Catholic Women's College Prays for a Miracle- New York Times
 Message from Sr. Jacqueline Marie Kieslich

Defunct private universities and colleges in Vermont
Defunct Catholic universities and colleges in the United States
Roman Catholic Diocese of Burlington
Embedded educational institutions
Educational institutions established in 1925
Educational institutions disestablished in 2000
Buildings and structures in Burlington, Vermont
Catholic universities and colleges in Vermont